A mallard is a type of duck.

Mallard may also refer to:

Vehicles
 LNER Class A4 4468 Mallard, the fastest steam locomotive ever, reaching 126 miles per hour
 Grumman G-73 Mallard, an amphibious aircraft of the late 1940s
 Advanced Aeromarine Mallard, an aircraft 
 HMS Mallard, the name of four ships of the Royal Navy
 USS Mallard, either of two United States naval ships

Music
 Mallard (band)
 Mallard (album), 1975
 Mallard Song, an ancient tradition of All Souls College, Oxford

Places in the United States
 Mallard (Charlotte neighborhood), in Charlotte, North Carolina
 Mallard, Iowa
 Mallard, Minnesota, an abandoned town site
 Point Mallard Park, in Decatur, Alabama
 Black Mallard River, Lower Peninsula of Michigan

Fiction
 Mallard Fillmore, a conservative politically oriented comic strip
 Dr. Donald "Ducky" Mallard, a character on the television show NCIS
 Gosalyn Mallard, a character created for the Disney animated series Darkwing Duck
 Millard the Mallard, a fictional character and mascot of WRVA radio in Richmond, Virginia
 Molly Mallard, a Disney character who is Scrooge McDuck's paternal grandmother
 Darkwing Duck, a Disney character whose alter-ego is Drake Mallard

Sports teams
 Fermanagh Mallards F.C., a women's association football team in Ballinamallard, Northern Ireland
 Madison Mallards, a collegiate summer baseball team from Madison, Wisconsin
 Quad City Mallards, an ice hockey team from Moline, Illinois

Other uses
 Mallard (documentation), a markup language for creation of user documentation
 Mallard (surname)
 Mallard BASIC, a BASIC interpreter for CP/M produced by Locomotive Software
 Mallard and Claret, a popular fishing fly in the United Kingdom
 6236 Mallard, a main-belt asteroid
 Operation Mallard, a part of World War II 1944 Operation Tonga in Normandy